This is a list of professional Latin American and South American opera companies and opera-related organizations. For opera companies from other geographical locations, see List of important opera companies.

Latin America

Central America

Belize

Costa Rica

El Salvador

Guatemala

Honduras

Panama

North America

Mexico

USA

South America

Argentina

Brazil

Chile

Peru

Venezuela

Opera companies
 Latin America
Companies, Latin America
Opera companies
Opera companies